Rikky and Pete is a 1988 Australian film directed by Nadia Tass, written by David Parker, and starring Stephen Kearney and Nina Landis.

Plot
Rikky Menzies (Nina Landis) is an out-of-work geologist and aspiring singer (vocals by Wendy Matthews). Her brother Pete Menzies (Stephen Kearney) is a misfit inventor. To find peace of mind and escape the ire of Police Sergeant Whitstead (Bill Hunter), they travel the outback of Australia until they reach the desert mining town of Mount Isa and its own zany individualists.

Cast
Stephen Kearney as Pete Menzies
Nina Landis as Rikky Menzies
Tetchie Agbayani as Flossie
Bill Hunter as Whitstead
Bruno Lawrence as Sonny
Bruce Spence as Ben
Lewis Fitz-Gerald as Adam
Dorothy Alison as Mrs. Menzies
Don Reid as Mr. Menzies
Peter Cummins as Delahunty
Peter Hehir as Desk Sergeant
Ralph Cotterill as George Pottinger
Roderick Williams as Holy Joe
Denis Lees as Fingers
Robert Baxter as Truckyard Man

Production
While United Artists provided $3 million of the budget, the rest of the money raised privately in Australia through 10BA. Shooting took place in Melbourne and Broken Hill.

Reception

Box office
Rikky and Pete grossed A$1,071,875 at the box office in Australia, which is equivalent to $2,014,185 in 2009 dollars.

Soundtrack
Most of the songs on the album were written and/or performed by alumni of Split Enz and their later bands Crowded House, The Makers, and Schnell Fenster.

Credits:

References

Further reading
 Murray, Scott (editor), Australian Film, 1978-1994, Oxford, 1995.

External links

Rikky and Pete at Oz Movies

1988 films
1988 comedy-drama films
Australian comedy-drama films
Films directed by Nadia Tass
Films set in Queensland
United Artists films
1988 comedy films
1988 drama films
1980s English-language films